This is a list of films which have placed number one at the weekend box office in Mexico during 2011.

Highest-grossing films

References

See also
 List of Mexican films — Mexican films by year

2011
Box
Mexico